Sciasminettia is a genus of small Palearctic flies of the family Lauxaniidae.

Species
S. dichaetophora (Hendel, 1907)
S. europaea Carles-Tolrá, 2006
S. similis Shatalkin, 2000

References

Lauxaniidae
Diptera of Asia
Lauxanioidea genera